Çukurca is a municipality (belde) and seat of Çukurca District in Hakkâri Province of Turkey. The city is populated by Kurds of the Ertoşî and Pinyanişî tribes and had a population of 7,485 in 2022. The mayor is Ensar Dündar from Justice and Development Party since 2019.

Neighborhoods 
Çukurca is divided into the three neighborhoods of Cumhuriyet, Emirşaban and Yeşilçeşme.

Jews 
Northeastern Jewish Aramaic-speaking Jews lived here historically; most fled during Sayfo, and the last remaining members of the community emigrated to Israel in 1951.

Population 
Population history from 2007 to 2022:

Climate 
Çukurca has a hot-summer subtype (Köppen: Dsa) of the humid continental climate.

References

Populated places in Hakkâri Province
Kurdish settlements in Hakkâri Province